The 2019–20 season is Lanús' 29th consecutive season in the top division of Argentine football. In addition to the Primera División, the club are competing in the Copa Argentina, Copa de la Superliga and Copa Sudamericana.

The season generally covers the period from 1 July 2019 to 30 June 2020.

Review

Pre-season
Young right winger Matías Vera was Lanús' first departure, as he agreed to be loaned to Barracas Central on 7 June 2019; Leandro Maciel also left on loan, joining Aldosivi five days later. Barracas Central signed another player from Lanús, with forward Rodrigo Pacheco agreeing permanent terms with the newly-promoted Primera B Nacional team on 11 June. On the same day, the club announced their first incoming - Ezequiel Muñoz from La Liga's Leganés. Agustín Rossi joined the club on loan from Boca Juniors on 12 June. A third transaction with Barracas Central was confirmed on 21 June, with Marcos Pinto agreeing to join them on loan from 3 July. Further players departed Lanús on loan on 22 June, as Marcos Astina and Leonardo Flores penned contracts with Atlanta.

Luciano Abecasis completed a move from Godoy Cruz on 26 June. Matías Ibáñez was loaned to Patronato on 29 June. Numerous loans from the previous campaign officially expired on and around 30 June. They were due to meet 3 de Febrero in a pre-season friendly on that same day, but the match was cancelled a day prior. Atlético de Rafaela snapped up Júnior Mendieta and Alan Bonansea from Lanús on 3 July. Barracas Central formalised a fourth signing from the club, a third on loan, on 4 July as Enzo Ortiz headed off across Buenos Aires. Gabriel Ramírez moved to Quilmes on 5 July. Lanús and Atlético Nacional played out a goalless exhibition draw on 6 July, in front of 18,122 fans. Sergio González went to Independiente Rivadavia on 8 July.

José Sand and Pablo Martínez scored goals in separate friendlies with Gimnasia y Esgrima on 10 July as the club secured back-to-back wins. Fernando Barrientos was loaned to Guaraní on 10 July, as Sebastián Ribas also left on loan on 11 July to Rosario Central. Nicolás Orsini was transferred to Lanús from Sarmiento on 12 July. Patronato got the better of Lanús across two exhibition matches on 13 July. On 14 July, Facundo Monteseirin switched Lanús for San Martín. A second loan incoming came on 17 July in River Plate's Carlos Auzqui. Also on that date, they shared victories in friendly matches with Arsenal de Sarandí.

July
An injury time strike from Marcelino Moreno saw Lanús progress through the Copa Argentina round of thirty-two on 20 July, as they eliminated Independiente Rivadavia of Primera B Nacional. Guillermo Acosta, days after featuring in the Copa Argentina match, headed to Atlético Tucumán on 25 July; seven months after Lanús had signed him from Tucumán. Lanús and Gimnasia y Esgrima shared the points on day one of the 2019–20 Primera División, with Lautaro Valenti netting on his league bow for Granate. Jorge Valdez Chamorro went to Atlanta on 31 July.

August
Lanús conceded three goals in a fixture away to River Plate in the league on 4 August. Nahuel Tecilla, to join former teammates Valdez Chamorro, Astina and Flores, signed for Atlanta on 7 August. Lanús put four past Barracas Central across two friendly games on 9 August. On 18 August, Lanús defeated Vélez Sarsfield 3–1 for their first Primera División win of the season. Lanús drew 1–1 with Defensores de Belgrano in a mid-season friendly on 21 August. Lanús made it six points from a possible six across their last two matches on 25 August, after Carlos Auzqui and Lautaro Acosta scored to give them victory over Unión Santa Fe. On 30 August, Lanús won their third consecutive league match after beating Central Córdoba at home.

September
An exhibition game with Almagro opened September for Lanús, as a brace from José Luis Sinisterra was followed by a goal from Gastón Lodico as they achieved a 3–1 win on 3 September.

Squad

Transfers
Domestic transfer windows:3 July 2019 to 24 September 201920 January 2020 to 19 February 2020.

Transfers in

Transfers out

Loans in

Loans out

Friendlies

Pre-season
Lanús agreed a pre-season friendly with Atlético Nacional in early June, with the fixture announced to take place at the Estadio Atanasio Girardot in Medellín, Colombia on 4 July 2019. Later friendlies were subsequently set with Argentine Primera División trio Gimnasia y Esgrima, Patronato and Arsenal de Sarandí. Lanús revealed a friendly with 3 de Febrero for 30 June, with the match taking place in Ciudad del Este; where they were having a training camp. However, the meeting was cancelled on 29 June.

Mid-season
Lanús and Barracas Central would meet in a friendly on 9 August in Ezeiza. Defensores de Belgrano would visit Lanús on 21 August, with Almagro doing the same on 3 September.

Competitions

Primera División

League table

Relegation table

Source: AFA

Results summary

Matches
The fixtures for the 2019–20 campaign were released on 10 July.

Copa Argentina

Lanús versus Independiente Rivadavia, in the Copa Argentina R32, was scheduled for the Estadio Julio Humberto Grondona, a neutral stadium as is normal in the cup, in Avellaneda on 20 July 2019. After defeating the Primera B Nacional team, Lanús  were drawn to face Argentinos Juniors in the round of sixteen.

Copa de la Superliga

Copa Sudamericana

Squad statistics

Appearances and goals

Statistics accurate as of 31 August 2019.

Goalscorers

Notes

References

Club Atlético Lanús seasons
Lanús